Søndersø is a town in central Denmark with a population of 3,319 (1 January 2022), located in Nordfyn municipality on the island of Funen.

Business
The town is home to the following companies:
 KiMs
 Heljan A/S
 Tinby A/S
 MT Miljøteknik Aps

Notable people
 Aase Hansen (1935 in Vigerslev in Søndersø – 1993) a Danish actor 
 Niels Rasmussen (1922–1991) a Danish rower, competed at the 1948 Summer Olympics
 Allan K. Pedersen (born 1962 in Veflinge, Søndersø) a Danish businessman, holds a controlling stake in FC Nordsjælland

References

External links
Nordfyn municipality

Cities and towns in the Region of Southern Denmark
Nordfyn Municipality
Populated places in Funen